Matthew Alexander "Matt" Castelo (born March 26, 1986) is a former professional gridiron football linebacker. He was signed by the Seattle Seahawks as an undrafted free agent in 2008. He played college football for the San Jose State Spartans.

Castelo was also a member of the Hamilton Tiger-Cats.

Early years
Born in San Jose, California to a Filipino American family, Castelo attended Valley Christian High School in San Jose, where he earned All-Central Coast Section honors twice. As a senior, he had 128 tackles, 10 sacks and was named league’s "Linebacker of the Year".

College career
Castelo started with the San Jose State Spartans in 2004. In his first game against Washington, Castelo had an interception. In 2005, Castelo finished the season with 91 tackles.

In 2006, Castelo was ranked number-two nationally with 165 total tackles.  He earned second-team all-WAC honors, and was the WAC Defensive Player of the Week. In the 2006 New Mexico Bowl, Castelo had 18 tackles and 2 forced fumbles and was named the defensive Most Valuable Player. He was named to ESPN.com's all-Bowl team.

In 2007, Castelo returned as the nation’s top returning tackler in terms of career average with a 9.42 per game. Castelo had 141 tackles in his senior season. He was named to the all-WAC first-team with teammate Dwight Lowery. Castelo completed his career at San Jose State with 433 (203 solo) tackles, 5.5 sacks, and 3 interceptions in 43 games.

Professional career

Seattle Seahawks
He was considered a prospect for the 2008 NFL Draft, but after going undrafted, signed with the Seattle Seahawks. Castelo was released from the Seahawks August 12, 2008.

Hamilton Tiger-Cats
Castelo signed with the Hamilton Tiger-Cats on May 21, 2009. He was released on June 25, 2009.

San Jose SaberCats
On April 21, 2011, Castelo signed with the San Jose SaberCats of the Arena Football League. Castelo made his professional football debut on April 23 against the Philadelphia Soul and had 3 tackles and a sack in what would be his only game for the team.

Post-football career
Castelo completed his Bachelor of Science degree in business management at the San Jose State Lucas College of Business in August 2010. He is now a real estate investor "who focuses primarily on older and distressed properties."

References

External links
San Jose State Spartans bio

1986 births
Living people
American football linebackers
American real estate businesspeople
Players of American football from San Jose, California
Players of Canadian football from San Jose, California
San Jose State Spartans football players
Seattle Seahawks players
Hamilton Tiger-Cats players
San Jose SaberCats players
American sportspeople of Filipino descent